Pitman is an unincorporated hamlet in Redburn Rural Municipality No. 130, Saskatchewan, Canada. Located 34 km southeast of Moose Jaw on Highway 39.

See also 
 List of communities in Saskatchewan
 Hamlets of Saskatchewan

References 

Unincorporated communities in Saskatchewan
Redburn No. 130, Saskatchewan
Division No. 6, Saskatchewan